Casamero Pueblo is an archaeological site including the partially excavated and stabilized ruins of an 11th-century Ancestral Puebloan community in Prewitt, New Mexico in McKinley County. It was an outlier of Chaco Canyon. It is on the Trail of the Ancients Scenic Byway.

Geography
The ruins are located on McKinley County Road 19, near Tecolote Mesa. Tecolote means "owl", and the red sandstone mesa has a formation that looks like the eyes of an owl.

History

Casamero Pueblo was an outlier of Chaco Canyon between about 1000 to 1125. Built with core-veneer masonry, the pueblo has 22 rooms on the ground floor and may have had 6 rooms on the second story. The settlement had 37 or more additional sites, many masonry dwellings, and a Great Kiva. Andrews Ranch, an outlier within the vicinity, was connected to the pueblo via a Chacoan road.

Between 1966 and 1967 the pueblo was excavated. The masonry was subsequently stabilized.

Facilities
The ruins are open throughout the year and are accessed via a short trail from the parking lot.

References

 
Buildings and structures in McKinley County, New Mexico
Native American history of New Mexico
Oasisamerica cultures
Parks in McKinley County, New Mexico
Pre-historic cities in the United States
Puebloan buildings and structures